Real Sociedad is a football club from San Sebastián, Basque Country. They have entered European competitions representing Spain's La Liga on 15 occasions.

Summary
The club has never appeared in a European final. Their best performance was in the 1982–83 European Cup when they reached the semi-finals, losing narrowly to eventual winners Hamburger SV.

La Real have twice competed in the group stages of the UEFA Champions League. In 2003–04 they qualified directly as runners-up in the previous season's domestic league, and progressed from the group before being beaten by Lyon in the first knockout round. Ten years later, in 2013–14 – having played no other European football and spent three years in the second division in the interim – they were again paired with Lyon, this time in the playoff round, and gained revenge by eliminating them, but subsequently finished bottom of the section.

In 2017, the club competed in the UEFA Europa League groups for the first time after gaining entry directly to that stage, having fallen in the last qualification round three years earlier.

In 2020, La Real appeared to be heading out of the competition at the group stage in the 90th minute of the last matchday, before a goal in stoppage time against SSC Napoli earned them a point, while a goal at almost the same moment in the other fixture meant defeat and elimination for AZ Alkmaar who had been set to go through.

Overall record
Accurate as of 16 March 2023

Source: UEFA.comPld = Matches played; W = Matches won; D = Matches drawn; L = Matches lost; GF = Goals for; GA = Goals against; GD = Goal Difference.

Results

Key

 1R: First round
 2R: Second round
 3R: Third round
 3Q: Third qualifying round
 PO: Play-off round

 a.e.t.: After extra time
 pen.: Penalties
  Round or group progressed
  Round or group eliminated

Notes

References

External links
  
 Real Sociedad at UEFA 
 RSSSF European Cups Archive
 Club profile at BDfutbol (match reports in each season)

European football
Spanish football clubs in international competitions